Emam Qeys (also Romanized as Emām Qeys and Imam Qais; also known as Emāmzādeh and Imam Onis) is a village in Dowrahan Rural District of Gandoman District, Borujen County, Chaharmahal and Bakhtiari province, Iran. At the 2006 census, its population was 2,638 in 615 households. The following census in 2011 counted 2,813 people in 763 households. The latest census in 2016 showed a population of 2,758 people in 799 households; it was the largest village in its rural district. The village is populated by Lurs.

References 

Borujen County

Populated places in Chaharmahal and Bakhtiari Province

Populated places in Borujen County